The Roman Catholic Diocese of Venado Tuerto is an Argentinian diocese within the Ecclesiastical Province of Rosario.

History
On 12 August 1963, Pope Paul VI established the Diocese of Venado Tuerto from the Diocese of Rosario, which on the same day was elevated to an archdiocese and Venado Tuerto became one of its suffragan sees.

Bishops

Ordinaries
 Fortunato Antonio Rossi (1963–1977), appointed Bishop of San Nicolás de los Arroyos
 Mario Picchi S.D.B. (1977–1989)
 Paulino Reale Chirina (1989–2000)
 Gustavo Arturo Help (2000–2021)
 Han Lim Moon (2021–present)

Other priest of this diocese who became bishop
Eduardo Eliseo Martín, appointed Bishop of Villa de la Concepción del Río Cuarto in 2006

References

Venado Tuerto
Venado Tuerto
Venado Tuerto
Venado Tuerto